The following lists events that happened during 2011 in the Democratic Republic of São Tomé and Príncipe.

Incumbents
President: 
Fradique de Menezes
Manuel Pinto da Costa
Prime Minister: Patrice Trovoada

Events
July 17-August 7: São Tomé and Príncipe presidential election, 2011, won by Manuel Pinto da Costa

Sports
Sporting Príncipe won the São Tomé and Príncipe Football Championship

References

 
Years of the 21st century in São Tomé and Príncipe
2010s in São Tomé and Príncipe
São Tomé and Príncipe
São Tomé and Príncipe